Two People (German: Zwei Menschen) is a 1930 German historical drama film directed by Erich Waschneck and starring Charlotte Susa, Gustav Fröhlich and Fritz Alberti.

The film was distributed by the German subsidiary of Universal Pictures. It is adapted from 1911 novel of the same title by Richard Voss. It has been filmed in Germany on two other occasions a 1924 silent Two People by Hanns Schwarz and a 1952 sound film Two People by Paul May.

The film's sets were designed by the art directors Leopold Blonder and Willy Schiller. It was partly shot on location in Italy.

Plot 
Junker Rochus and Judith Platter are in love. Rochus' mother, a domineering religious fanatic, wants him to break off the relationship and become a priest, but he is reluctant to do so. The mother swears that he will take up orders, but when he does not follow through she dies of grief. Feeling guilty, Rochus reluctantly abandons his romance with Judith and enters the priesthood. Judith commits suicide, and Rochus finds that he must preside at her funeral.

Cast 
Charlotte Susa as Judith Platter  
 Gustav Fröhlich as Junker Rochus  
 Friedrich Kayßler as Der Kardinal  
 Fritz Alberti as Graf Enna  
 Hermine Sterler as Gräfin Enna  
 Karl Platen as Der Diener Florian 
 Bernd Aldor as Hauskaplan  
 Harry Nestor as Der Jungknecht Martin  
 Lucie Englisch as Die Jungmagd Josepha  
 Theodor Loos as Ein Prior  
 Friedrich Ettel as Der Prior vom Kloster Neustift

References

Bibliography
 Goble, Alan. The Complete Index to Literary Sources in Film. Walter de Gruyter, 1999.

External links 

1930 films
Films of the Weimar Republic
1930s German-language films
German black-and-white films
Films directed by Erich Waschneck
Universal Pictures films
Remakes of German films
Sound film remakes of silent films
Films about Catholic priests
Films set in the Alps
Films based on German novels
German historical drama films
1930s historical drama films
1930 drama films
1930s German films